Ståle Stensaas (born 7 July 1971 in Trondheim) is a Norwegian football coach and former player. He spent the majority of his career at Rosenborg, and he is currently coaching Rosenborg's junior team.

Career
Stensaas played for the Norwegian Tippeliga side Rosenborg from 1992 to 1997. One of the highlights of his career is his super goal against Blackburn Rovers in the UEFA Champions League in 1995. He was sold to Scottish club Rangers, where he scored goals against Kilmarnock in the league and Falkirk in the League Cup. He struggled to hold a place in the Rangers team and he returned to Rosenborg in 2000. Stensaas was sold to F.C Lyn Oslo in the winter 2007, on a two-year contract. In the 2008 season he was on loan to Tippeligaen rivals Lillestrøm SK.

He has nine caps, and one goal.

After his career as professional football player ended in 2008, he started coaching Rosenborg's junior team. The team won the Norwegian junior championship in the 2009 season

Personal life 
Stensaas has three children: Andreas, Hanne and Sophie. He is a carpenter by profession, in addition to professional footballing.

Honours 
Rosenborg
Norwegian Premier League Champion (8): 1994, 1995, 1996, 2000, 2001, 2002, 2003, 2004, 2006
Norwegian Football Cup Win: 1995, 2003

References

External links

Profile at lynfotball.net
Profile at lyn.no
Ståle Stensaas at RBKweb

1971 births
Living people
Norwegian footballers
Norway international footballers
Rangers F.C. players
Nottingham Forest F.C. players
Rosenborg BK players
Lillestrøm SK players
Lyn Fotball players
Premier League players
Scottish Premier League players
Eliteserien players
Expatriate footballers in England
Expatriate footballers in Scotland
Norwegian expatriate footballers
Scottish Football League players
Association football defenders
Footballers from Trondheim